The 2005 National Leagues (known as the LHF Healthplan National Leagues due to sponsorship) were the second, third and fourth divisions of rugby league in the UK.

National League One

Table

Play-offs

National League Two

Table

Play-offs

National League Three

Table

Play-offs

Week 1
St Albans Centurions 40-6 Hemel Stags

Warrington Wizards 48-12 Sheffield Hillsborough Hawks

Week 2
Bradford Dudley Hill 18-19 Bramley Buffaloes

St Albans Centurions 46–24 Warrington Wizards

Week 3 
Bradford Dudley Hill 63-10 St Albans Centurions

Grand Final 

Bradford Dudley Hill 28-26 Bramley Buffaloes

See also

Rugby League Championships

References

External links
Rugby Football League

RFL League 1
Rugby Football League Championship
Rugby League National Leagues